"Renegade Master" is a song by English DJ/producer Wildchild, released as a single in 1995. It reached No. 11 on the UK Singles Chart. The previous single, "Legends of the Dark Black Pt 2 (Renegade Master Mix)" is the same as "Renegade Master", just with a different title, which reached No. 34. It samples vocals from A.D.O.R.'s "One for the Trouble". "Renegade Master" was remixed by Fatboy Slim in 1997 and reached No. 3 in the UK, becoming the most successful version of the song.

Critical reception 
British magazine Music Week rated the 1995 version of the song four out of five, adding, "Wildchild's passion for classic electro and hip hop has been put to good use, jumbling Public Enemy-influenced repetitive sounds and fresh house beats." In 1997, they gave the '98 remix five out of five, writing that "Norman Cook's infectious mix — along with house and breakbeat mixes from Stretch & Vern and Urban Takeover — should bring it even greater chart success this time around."

Track listing

Renegade Master '98 

"Renegade Master" was remixed by Fatboy Slim, titled "Renegade Master '98". It was released as a single on 5 January 1998 and surpassed the original's chart position, peaking at No. 3 on the UK Singles Chart as well as No. 1 on the UK Dance Singles Chart.

Certifications

References

1995 songs
1995 singles
1998 singles
English electronic songs
English house music songs
Big beat songs